Pavel Korostelyov (born 25 November 1978) is a Russian cross-country skier. He competed in the men's sprint event at the 2006 Winter Olympics.

References

1978 births
Living people
Russian male cross-country skiers
Olympic cross-country skiers of Russia
Cross-country skiers at the 2006 Winter Olympics
Sportspeople from Yaroslavl